Pour Sacha (English title: For Sacha) is a 1991 French romantic drama film directed by Alexandre Arcady and starring Sophie Marceau, Gérard Darmon, and Ayelet Zurer. The film is set just prior to the outbreak of the Six-Day War in 1967.

Plot
Sacha and Laura, who have been living on a kibbutz in Israel near the Syrian border for two years, are visited by three friends from Paris - Simon, Michel, and Paul - who have come to celebrate Laura's twentieth birthday. One of the friends, Simon, is obsessed by the death of the girl he loved. During the birthday celebration, he tries to find amongst his friends someone to blame for his love's death. Laura is the only one who knows that the young girl died of a broken heart. She also loved Sacha. The film ends as war is declared in Israel.

Cast
 Sophie Marceau as Laura 
 Richard Berry as Sacha 
 Fabien Orcier as Paul 
 Niels Dubost as Simon 
 Frédéric Quiring as Michel 
 Jean-Claude de Goros as Dam Chemtov 
 Gérard Darmon as David Malka 
 Emmanuelle Riva as Mrs. Malka 
 Shlomit Cohen as Myriam 
 Yael Abecassis as Judith 
 Amit Goren as Steve 
 Nissim Zohar as Le Maskir 
 Salim Dau as Wallid 
 Ayelet Zurer as Shoshana 
 Ezra Kafri as Le colonel
 Michal Yannai as Anglaise n° 1

References

External links
  

1991 films
Films about the kibbutz
French romantic drama films
1990s French-language films
Films directed by Alexandre Arcady
Films scored by Philippe Sarde
Films set in 1967
Works about the Six-Day War
1990s French films